Mississippi in Africa: The Saga of the Slaves of Prospect Hill Plantation and Their Legacy in Liberia Today is a 2004 non-fiction book by Alan Huffman, published by the University Press of Mississippi. It chronicles Americo-Liberians who originated from the Prospect Hill Plantation in Mississippi and who settled Mississippi-in-Africa.

The book had a working title of "Prospect Hill" though the final title was "Mississippi in Africa".

Reception
Publishers Weekly praised the "fascinating" concept, though it criticized the excessive detail which it argued made the pace "plodding", and that the book "meanders" with excessive commentary from the author.

Kirkus Reviews stated that it is "Thought-provoking and expertly told—and a most promising debut."

The Journal of Pan African Studies stated that the work has "riveting prose".

References

Further reading

External links
 Mississippi in Africa - University Press of Mississippi
 Mississippi in Africa - Available on the Internet Archive

2004 books
Books about Mississippi
Books about Liberia
University Press of Mississippi books
Americo-Liberian people